Castenedolo is a comune in the province of Brescia, in Lombardy.  It is bounded by other communes of Montichiari and San Zeno Naviglio.  The commune is situated in the plain southeast of Brescia.

Twin towns
Castenedolo is twinned with:

  Gradačac, Bosnia and Herzegovina

References

Cities and towns in Lombardy